Woman power may refers to:

Woman Power, a feminist journal published by the Congress of American Women between 1946 and 1950.
"Woman Power": a song on Yoko Ono's album Feeling the Space.